James Paul Stewart (July 1, 1924 – January 9, 2019) was a United States Coast Guard vice admiral. He served as Commander of the Coast Guard Pacific Area and Third Coast Guard District.

References

1924 births
2019 deaths
United States Coast Guard admirals